The ifs internationale filmschule köln gmbh (international film school cologne) is a privately funded film school in Cologne, Northrhine-Westphalia, Germany. The film school was founded by Filmstiftung NRW.

In the German film school ranking of Focus (issue 22/2006), the international filmschool cologne—together with the Academy of Media Arts Cologne and the dffb—were ranked as second after the Film Academy Baden-Württemberg. Evaluation criteria were the reputation of the university, the support for the students, the technical equipment and the number of awards won.

Faculty 
Professors and guest teachers at the ifs include:

 Hans-Christian Schmid
 Keith Johnstone
 David Bordwell
 Klaus Maria Brandauer
 Frank Griebe
 Seymour Cassel
 Donn Cambern

References

External links 
filmschule.de official website 
filmschule.de/en official website 

Film schools in Germany
Universities and colleges in Cologne
Mass media in Cologne
2000 establishments in Germany
Educational institutions established in 2000